State Road 513 (SR 513), also known as South Patrick Drive, is a short north–south road located along the western side of the barrier island towns of Indian Harbour Beach, Satellite Beach and South Patrick Shores in Brevard County. The southern terminus is at an intersection with SR 518 near the eastern end of the Eau Gallie Causeway in Indian Harbour Beach. The northern terminus is at a partial interchange with the Pineda Causeway (SR 404), just south of the southern entrance of Patrick Space Force Base.

Route description
The road starts at the intersection of the Eau Gallie Causeway (SR 518) and Riverside Drive/South Patrick Drive, with SR 518 starting north on South Patrick Drive, through a mix of commercial and residential areas, staying within a few blocks of the Banana River.  The road enters Satellite Beach, and intersects CR 3 (Banana River Drive).  North of the intersection, SR 513 becomes more residential, with the occasional commercial development, and continues through the beach community.  The road ends at SR 404, the Pineda Causeway, a former toll road with access to U.S. Route 1 (SR 5) on the mainland in South Patrick Shores.  North of SR 404, the road approaches the main entrance of Patrick Space Force Base.

The road continues south of SR 513's southern terminus as Riverside Drive, crossing US 192 in Indialantic, and ending at Ocean Avenue in Melbourne Beach, two blocks west of SR A1A.

Major intersections

References

External links

513
513
State Roads in Melbourne, Florida
Indian Harbour Beach, Florida